The United States Tax Court (in case citations, T.C.) is a federal trial court of record established by Congress under Article I of the U.S. Constitution, section 8 of which provides (in part) that the Congress has the power to "constitute Tribunals inferior to the supreme Court". The Tax Court specializes in adjudicating disputes over federal income tax, generally prior to the time at which formal tax assessments are made by the Internal Revenue Service.

Though taxpayers may choose to litigate tax matters in a variety of legal settings, outside of bankruptcy, the Tax Court is the only forum in which taxpayers may do so without having first paid the disputed tax in full. Parties who contest the imposition of a tax may also bring an action in any United States District Court, or in the United States Court of Federal Claims; however these venues require that the tax be paid first, and that the party then file a lawsuit to recover the contested amount paid (the "full payment rule" of Flora v. United States).

The main emblem of the tax court represents a fasces.

History

The first incarnation of the Tax Court was the "U.S. Board of Tax Appeals", established by Congress in the Revenue Act of 1924 (also known as the Mellon tax bill) in order to address the increasing complexity of tax-related litigation. Those serving on the Board were simply designated as "members." The members of the Board were empowered to select, on a biennial basis, one of their members as "chairman." In July 1924, Coolidge announced the appointment of the first twelve appointees, of which seven members were appointed from private life and the other five from the Bureau of Internal Revenue. Additional members were appointed in the fall, and the Board when fully constituted originally had 16 members, with Charles D. Hamel serving as the first Chairman. The Board was initially established as an "independent agency in the executive branch of the government." It was housed in the Internal Revenue Service Building in the Federal Triangle. The first session of the Board of Tax Appeals spanned July 16, 1924 to May 31, 1925.

In 1929, the United States Supreme Court indicated that the Board of Tax Appeals was not a "court," but was instead "an executive or administrative board, upon the decision of which the parties are given an opportunity to base a petition for review to the courts after the administrative inquiry of the Board has been had and decided."

In 1942, Congress passed the Revenue Act of 1942, renaming the Board as the "Tax Court of the United States". With this change, the Members became Judges and the Chairman became the Presiding Judge. By 1956, overcrowding and the desire to separate judicial and executive powers led to initial attempts to relocate the court. In 1962, Secretary of the Treasury Douglas Dillon appealed to the U.S. General Services Administration (GSA) to incorporate funds for the design of a new building in its upcoming budget. The GSA allocated $450,000, and commissioned renowned architect Victor A. Lundy, who produced a design that was approved in 1966. However, funding constraints brought on by the Vietnam War delayed the start of construction until 1972.

The Tax Court was again renamed to its current formal designation in the Tax Reform Act of 1969, changing it from an historically administrative court to a full judicial court. The completed United States Tax Court Building was dedicated on November 22, 1974, the fiftieth anniversary of the Revenue Act that created the court.

In 1991, the U.S. Supreme Court in Freytag v. Commissioner stated that the current United States Tax Court is an "Article I legislative court" that "exercises a portion of the judicial power of the United States." The Court explained the Tax Court "exercises judicial power to the exclusion of any other function" and that it "exercises its judicial power in much the same way as the federal district courts exercise theirs...." This "exclusively judicial role distinguishes it from other non-Article III tribunals that perform multiple functions..." Thus, Freytag concluded that the Tax Court exercises "judicial, rather than executive, legislative, or administrative, power." The Tax Court "remains independent of the Executive and Legislative Branches" in the sense that its decisions are not subject to appellate review by Congress, the President, or for that matter, Article III district courts. The President, however, may remove the Tax Court judges, after notice and opportunity for public hearing, for "inefficiency," "neglect of duty," or "malfeasance in office."

Justice Scalia penned a separate concurrence for four justices in Freytag. These justices dissented as to the Court majority's rationale; they would have characterized the Tax Court's power as "executive" rather than "judicial." Scalia said that to him "it seem[ed]... entirely obvious that the Tax Court, like the Internal Revenue Service, the FCC, and the NLRB, exercises executive power." Notwithstanding Scalia's sharp dissents in landmark separation-of-powers cases such as Mistretta v. United States and Morrison v. Olson, Scalia apparently "describe[d] Freytag as the single worst opinion of his incumbency" on the U.S. Supreme Court.

Although the 2008 U.S. government directory of executive and legislative appointed officers ("the Plum Book") categorized the Tax Court as part of the legislative branch, the 2012 revised version removed the Tax Court and listed it under neither the legislative nor the executive branches.

Under an amendment to the Internal Revenue Code of 1986 enacted in late 2015, the U.S. Tax Court "is not an agency of, and shall be independent of, the executive branch of the Government." However, section 7443(f) of the Code still provides that a Tax Court judge may be removed by the President "for inefficiency, neglect of duty, or malfeasance in office".

Jurisdiction of the Tax Court

The Tax Court provides a judicial forum in which affected persons can dispute tax deficiencies determined by the Commissioner of Internal Revenue prior to payment of the disputed amounts. The jurisdiction of the Tax Court includes, but is not limited to the authority to hear:

 tax disputes concerning notices of deficiency
 notices of transferee liability
 certain types of declaratory judgment
 readjustment and adjustment of partnership items
 review of the failure to abate interest
 administrative costs
 worker classification
 relief from joint and several liability on a joint return
 review of certain collection actions

Congress amended the Internal Revenue Code, now codified in Internal Revenue Code section 7482, providing that decisions of the Tax Court may be reviewed by the applicable geographical United States Court of Appeals other than the Court of Appeals for the Federal Circuit. (See Article I and Article III tribunals).

"Small Tax Cases" are conducted under Internal Revenue Code section 7463, and generally involve only amounts in controversy of $50,000 or less for any one tax year. The "Small Tax Case" procedure is available "at the option of the taxpayer." These cases are neither appealable nor precedential.

At times there have been efforts in the Congress and the Tax Bar to create a single national Court of Appeals for tax cases (or make Tax Court decisions appealable to a single existing Court of Appeals), to maintain uniformity in the application of the nation's tax laws (the very reason underlying the creation of the Tax Court and the grant of national jurisdiction to the Tax Court), but efforts to avoid "hometown results" or inconsistent results due to a lack of expertise have failed.

An important reason for the movements to create a single national Court of Appeals for tax cases is that the United States Tax Court does not have exclusive jurisdiction over tax cases. In addition to the Tax Court, federal tax matters can be heard and decided in three other courts: U.S. District Courts, the Court of Federal Claims, and the Bankruptcy Court. In the first two instances, the taxpayer bringing the claim generally must have first paid the deficiency determined by the IRS. For the Bankruptcy Court, the tax matter must, of course, arise as an issue in a bankruptcy proceeding. Bankruptcy Court appeals are initially to the U.S. District Court. Appeals beyond the U.S. District Courts and the Court of Federal Claims follow the same path as those from the U.S. Tax Court as described above.

With this number of courts involved in making legal determinations on federal tax matters including all 13 United States Courts of Appeals exercising appellate jurisdiction (the 11 numbered Circuits, the Federal Circuit (for appeals from the U.S. Court of Federal Claims), and the D.C. Circuit), some observers express concern that the tax laws can be interpreted differently for like cases. Thus arises the movement on the part of some for a U.S. Court of Federal Tax Appeals, though the merits of this are a matter of much discussion.

Representation of parties

The Chief Counsel of the Internal Revenue Service (IRS) or his delegate represents the executive branch in the Tax Court. The Tax Court permits persons who are not Attorneys at Law to be admitted to practice (to represent taxpayers) by applying for admission and passing an examination administered by the Court. Attorneys who provide evidence of membership and good standing in state bar or the D.C. bar can be admitted to the bar of the Court without sitting for the Tax Court examination. Tax Court practice is highly specialized and most practitioners are licensed attorneys who specialize in tax controversies.

Genesis of a Tax Court dispute

Many Tax Court cases involve disputes over Federal income tax and penalties, often after an examination by the Internal Revenue Service of a taxpayer's return. After issuance of a series of preliminary written notices and a lack of agreement between the taxpayer and the IRS, the IRS formally "determines" the amount of the "deficiency" and issues a formal notice called a "statutory notice of deficiency," or "ninety day letter". In this context, the term "deficiency" is a legal term of art, and is not necessarily equal to the amount of unpaid tax (although it usually is). The deficiency is generally the excess of the amount the IRS contends is the correct tax over the amount the taxpayer showed on the return—in both cases, without regard to how much has actually been paid.

Upon issuance of the statutory notice of deficiency (after IRS determination of the tax amount, but before the formal IRS assessment of the tax), the taxpayer generally has 90 days to file a Tax Court petition for "redetermination of the deficiency". If no petition is timely filed, the IRS may then statutorily "assess" the tax. To "assess" the tax in this sense means to administratively and formally record the tax on the books of the United States Department of the Treasury. This formal statutory assessment is a critical act, as the statutory tax lien that later arises is effective retroactively to the date of the assessment, and encumbers all property and rights to property of the taxpayer.

Life cycle of a Tax Court case

Because of the negative legal consequences ensuing with respect to a statutory assessment (especially the tax lien and the Flora requirement that the taxpayer otherwise pay the full disputed amount and sue for refund), a taxpayer is often well advised to file a Tax Court petition in a timely manner. The rule in the Tax Court is that the taxpayer sues the "Commissioner of Internal Revenue," with the taxpayer as "petitioner" and the Commissioner as "respondent." This rule is an example of an exception to the general rule that the proper party defendant in a U.S. tax case filed by a taxpayer against the government is "United States of America." In the Tax Court, the Commissioner is not named personally. The "Secretary of the Treasury", the "Department of the Treasury" and the "Internal Revenue Service" are not proper parties.

The petition must be timely filed within the allowable time. The Court cannot extend the time for filing which is set by statute. A $60 filing fee must be paid when the petition is filed. Once the petition is filed, payment of the underlying tax ordinarily is postponed until the case has been decided. In certain tax disputes involving $50,000 or less, taxpayers may elect to have the case conducted under the Court's simplified small tax case procedure. Trials in small tax cases generally are less formal and result in a speedier disposition. However, decisions entered pursuant to small tax case procedures are not appealable and are not precedential.

Cases are calendared for trial as soon as practicable (on a first in/first out basis) after the case becomes at issue. When a case is calendared, the parties are notified by the Court of the date, time, and place of trial. Trials are conducted before one judge, without a jury, and taxpayers are permitted to represent themselves if they desire. However, the vast majority of cases are settled by mutual agreement without the necessity of a trial. However, if a trial is conducted, in due course a report is ordinarily issued by the presiding judge setting forth findings of fact and an opinion. The case is then closed in accordance with the judge's opinion by entry of a decision.

Appellate review

Either the petitioner (the taxpayer) or the respondent (the Commissioner of Internal Revenue) may take an appeal from an adverse decision of the Tax Court to the appropriate United States Court of Appeals. In the case of an appeal by the taxpayer, a bond is normally required in order to avoid enforcement action during the pendency of the appeal. Instead of taking an appeal, the Internal Revenue Service may issue an "Action on Decision" indicating the Commissioner's "non-acquiescence" in the decision, meaning that the Commissioner will not follow the decision in subsequent cases. In such cases, the Commissioner hopes for the opportunity to litigate the matter in another circuit where he will have a better chance of obtaining reversal on appeal.

Judges

The Tax Court is composed of 19 judges appointed by the President and confirmed by the Senate. Former judges whose terms have ended may become "Senior judges", able to return and assist the court by hearing cases while serving on recall. In addition, the court is assisted by a number of "special trial judges", who are employees of the court, appointed by the chief judge of the Tax Court, rather than by the President. Special trial judges serve a function similar to that served by United States magistrate judges of the district courts, and may hear cases regarding alleged deficiencies or overpayments of up to $50,000. Reappointment, when requested by a Tax Court judge (I.R.C. 7447(b)(3)) is generally pro forma regardless of the political party of the appointing President and the political party of the re-appointing (sitting) President. Each active judge appointed by the President has two law clerks (attorney-advisers) and each senior judge and special trial judge has one law clerk.

President George W. Bush was heavily criticized by the U.S. Congress, the Tax Bar, and others when he indicated that he likely would not, or might not, re-appoint Tax Court judges whose terms were expiring (even though the first Judge whose re-appointment President Bush called into question, Judge John O. Colvin, was appointed by President Ronald Reagan). President Bill Clinton also was criticized for not acting timely to re-appoint Tax Court judges, having allowed one sitting Chief Judge's term to expire, thus requiring the Tax Court to elect a new Chief Judge. Additionally, several Tax Court Judges had to wait more than a year (sometimes more than two years) to be reappointed during the Clinton presidency.

Trial sessions are conducted and other work of the Court is performed by its judges, by senior judges serving on recall, and by special trial judges. All of the judges have expertise in the tax laws, and are tasked to "apply that expertise in a manner to ensure that taxpayers are assessed only what they owe, and no more". Although the "principal office" of the Court is located in the District of Columbia, Tax Court judges may sit "at any place within the United States". The judges travel nationwide to conduct trials in various designated cities. The work of the Tax Court has occasionally been interrupted by events. In 2001, a trial session in New York City was canceled due to the September 11 terrorist attacks. In 2005, stops in Miami and New Orleans were canceled due to the effects of hurricanes which had struck shortly before their scheduled visit to each city.

The Tax Court's judges serve 15-year terms, subject to presidential removal during the term for "[I]nefficiency, neglect of duty, or malfeasance in office." The mandatory retirement age for judges is 70. The judges' salaries are set at the same rate as "[J]udges of the district courts of the United States", currently $210,900.00 per annum.

Current composition of the court
:

Current special trial judges
, the special trial judges on the court are as follows:

Vacancies and pending nominations

Former members of the Board of Tax Appeals and Tax Court
Former members were part of the Board of Tax Appeals until 1942, and part of the Tax Court since 1942.

Succession of seats

Notes

Past special trial judges
D. Irvin Couvillion (1985–)
Carleton D. Powell (1985–2007)
John J. Pajak (1979–)
Norman H. Wolfe (1985–)
Daniel J. Dinan (1991–)
John F. Dean (1994–2014)
Lehman C. Aarons (1975–1986)
Robert N. Armen (1993–2019)
Helen A. Buckley (1983–1994)
Randolph F. Caldwell Jr. (1971–1985)
Francis J. Cantrel (1977–1994)
Murray H. Falk (1975–1981)
Lee M. Galloway (1981–1993)
Fred S. Gilbert Jr. (1977–1984)
Stanley J. Goldberg (1985–)
James M. Gussis (1970–1994)
Darrell D. Hallett (1980–1983)
Joseph N. Ingolia (1970–1977)
Charles R. Johnston (1970–1980)
Larry L. Nameroff (1986–)
Edna G. Parker (1977–1980; elevated to a regular seat on the Tax Court)
Joan Seitz Pate (1983–1994)
Marvin F. Peterson (1979–1994; Chief Special Trial Judge, 1987–1994)
John H. Sacks (1970–1977)
Fred R. Tansill (1980–1986)
Hu S. Vandervort (1984–1989)

References

Citations

Sources 

 Some information on this page is from the web site of the U.S. Tax Court, which, as a publication of the United States government, is in the public domain.

External links

 

 
United States federal law
Tax Court
Taxation in the United States
1924 establishments in the United States
Courts and tribunals established in 1924